The 2008 FILA European Wrestling Championships were held in Tampere, Finland. The event took place from 1 April to 6 April 2008.

Medal table

Medal summary

Men's freestyle

Men's Greco-Roman

Women's freestyle

External links
Official website
Fila's official championship website

Europe
W
European Wrestling Championships
2008 in European sport
International wrestling competitions hosted by Finland
April 2008 sports events in Europe
Sports competitions in Tampere